is a Japanese women's professional shogi player ranked 2-kyū.

Early life and becoming a women's professional shogi player
Sakaki was born in Osaka on November 12, 2003. She learned how to play shogi as elementary school student when a friend asked her to play. Under the guidance of shogi professional Toshiaki Kubo, she entered the Kansai branch of the Japan Shogi Association's training group system and subsequently qualified for women's professional status after being promoted to training group B2 in April 2022.

Promotion history
Sakaki's promotion history is as follows.

 2-kyū: May 1, 2022

Note: All ranks are women's professional ranks.

References

External links
 ShogiHub: Sakaki, Nana

2003 births
Living people
Japanese shogi players
Women's professional shogi players
Professional shogi players from Osaka Prefecture